Yvonne Krivohravek (or Krivohlavek) is an Austrian football striker who played for USC Landhaus Wien and SV Neulengbach in the ÖFB-Frauenliga. She was among the championship's top scorers in 2001 and 2002 and scored Landhaus' only goal in the 2001-02 UEFA Women's Cup.

She was a member of the Austrian national team.

References

1981 births
Living people
Austrian women's footballers
USC Landhaus Wien players
SV Neulengbach (women) players
Austria women's international footballers
Women's association football forwards
ÖFB-Frauenliga players